Franklin Rowe is an American fashion designer, known for his "African-American and elegant Euro sensibilities". He has fashion boutiques, Franklin Rowe International, in Atlanta and New York City.

About 
He was born in the Bronx and attended Fiorello H. LaGuardia High School and won a scholarship to attend Traphagen School of Fashion. After graduation he lived briefly in Albuquerque, New Mexico and returned to New York City a few years later.

He has worked as celebrity designer, dressing Taye Diggs, Mary J. Blige, Grace Jones, Dionne Warwick, and Queen Latifah, among others.

References 

People from the Bronx
American fashion designers
Fiorello H. LaGuardia High School alumni
Traphagen School of Fashion alumni
Year of birth missing (living people)
Living people
African-American fashion designers